A career statistics article for tennis player Guillermo Coria.

2003 
Year-end ranking No. 5
Injuries: Late January, retired from Australian Open. Mid May, withdrew from Hypo Group Tennis International due to a groin muscle injury.Early August, retired from Canada Masters. Late October, retired from Paris Masters.

Singles matches

2004 
Year-end ranking No. 7

Singles matches

2005 
Year-end ranking No. 8

Singles matches 

Coria, Guillermo